Peter Jepsen (born 1982) is a Danish poker player. In March 2007, he won the European Poker Tour zł15,000 No Limit Hold'em in Warsaw, Poland, netting him $415,679. In September 2008, he set a new World Record for winning the biggest ever pot in online poker history.

Peter Jepsen was in 2019 convicted for cheating and received a three-year prison sentence.

Peter was part of the Betfair Poker Pro team.

Poker 
Jepsen describes his entry into the world of poker as a "coincidence". He first took up the game after being sent home from his tour of duty with the Royal Danish Army in Iraq, where he served predominantly as part of the Military Police. Initially, Jepsen played online poker with his friends purely as a pastime, but he soon realised that Poker could become more than just a hobby. He admits that he lost several thousand dollars whilst learning how to play, but that he persevered nonetheless, because he was "100% convinced" that he could make a success of it.

As of 2009, Jepsen's live tournament winnings exceed $600,000. His greatest success to date, in March 2007, came in Warsaw, Poland in the 3rd season of the European Poker Tour, where he took first place and a prize of zł1,226,711 ($415,679).

Previous to this, Jepsen had finished 3rd in the Caribbean Poker Classic in St. Kitts, which netted him his first major live cash return of $165,000.

Hacking Charges 
Jepsen was eventually charged by Danish authorities for exploiting computers. He engineered a ploy to remotely inspect cards during online poker games.

World Record 
Despite his success in live tournaments, Jepsen is still perhaps better known for his successes in online poker. In September 2008, Jepsen broke the world record for the biggest pot ever won in online poker, when he won a pot of $499,037 against Tom Dwan. Jepsen's record has been eclipsed since then.

Notes

External links
Official blog

1982 births
Danish poker players
Living people
European Poker Tour winners